Admiral Brown may refer to:

Royal Navy
Brian Brown (Royal Navy officer) (1934–2020), British Royal Navy admiral
David Brown (Royal Navy officer) (1927–2005), British Royal Navy vice admiral
Francis Clifton Brown (1874–1963), British Royal Navy vice admiral
Harold Brown (Royal Navy officer) (1878–1968), British Royal Navy vice admiral
William Brown (Royal Navy officer) (1764–1814), officer (Rear-Admiral) of the British Royal Navy during the Napoleonic Wars

U.S. Coast Guard
Erroll M. Brown (born 1950), Rear Admiral in the U.S. Coast Guard, and the first African-American promoted to flag rank
Manson K. Brown (born 1956), U.S. Coast Guard vice admiral
Peter J. Brown (fl. 2010s–2020s), U.S. Coast Guard rear admiral

U.S. Navy
Annette E. Brown, Rear Admiral of the U.S. Navy
Brian B. Brown (born 1964), U.S. Navy vice admiral
Charles R. Brown (1899–1983), U.S. Navy four-star admiral
Clarence John Brown (1895–1973), U.S. Navy vice admiral
F. Taylor Brown (1925–2011), U.S. Navy rear admiral
George Brown (admiral) (1835–1913), American naval officer
John H. Brown Jr. (1891–1963), U.S. Navy vice admiral
Nancy Elizabeth Brown (born 1952), American Vice Admiral serving as the Director, Command, Control, Communications and Computer Systems
Thomas L. Brown II (born 1960), U.S. Navy rear admiral
William A. Brown (admiral) (born 1958), U.S. Navy vice admiral
Wilson Brown (admiral) (1881–1957), World War II naval commander

Other
William Brown (admiral) (1777–1857), also known in Spanish as Guillermo Brown or Almirante Brown, a hero of Argentina